Raymond Lucas (13 December 1918 – 15 December 2006) was a French racing cyclist. Born in Paris (Ile-de-France), France on December 13, 1918. He started his career in the Tour de Picardie in 1939. He rode in the 1947 and 1949 Tour de France. He also rode in the La Fleche Wallone  and Criterium National de la Route in 1949.

References

External links
 

1918 births
2006 deaths
French male cyclists
Cyclists from Paris